Julien Chaerels (born 26 May 1908) was a Belgian cyclist. He competed in the individual and team road race events at the 1928 Summer Olympics.

References

External links
 

1908 births
Year of death missing
Belgian male cyclists
Olympic cyclists of Belgium
Cyclists at the 1928 Summer Olympics